Friedrich David Gräter (1768 – 1830) was one of the founders of the field of Scandinavian studies and Germanic philology in Germany.

A native of  Schwäbisch Hall, Gräter studied theology, philosophy, and philology in  Halle and Erlangen.
He worked as a gymnasium teacher of Greek and Hebrew in Schwäbisch Hall from 1804 as rector. He was a member of Pegnesischer Blumenorden from 1781 and member of the Berlin Academy of Sciences from 1792. He married Christiane Spittler in 1799. They had no children and divorced in 1803. In 1805, Gräter married Maria Elisabetha, née  Hofmann, widowed Seiferheld und Haspel, with whom he had a daughter. In 1818, he became rector of the gymnasium at Ulm. He retired in 1826 and moved to Schorndorf.

Gräter was among the first scholars to systematically approach old German and Scandinavian philology in the 1780s and 1790s.
He published an anthology of Old Norse poetry in 1789 (Nordische Blumen). He was the editor of the journals Bragur and Idunna und Hermode. He bitterly criticized the Romanticist character of the early publications of the Brothers Grimm. The enmity between Gräter and the Grimms contributed to a systematic suppression of Gräter's achievements in the earlier history of the field; in the opinion of Heinrichs (1986), the Grimms "all but succeeded in suppressing the founder of scholarly Nordic studies in Germany."

References 

 Anne Heinrichs, "Die Brüder Grimm versus Friedrich David Gräter – ein fatales Zerwürfnis" in: Württembergisch Franken 70 (1986), 19–34.
 Dieter Narr, "Friedrich David Gräter und sein Beitrag zur Volkskunde" in Narr (ed.),  Studien zur Spätaufklärung im deutschen Südwesten (1979), 379–403.
 I. Schwarz, Friedrich David Gräter (1935).
 Friedrich David Gräter (Württembergisch Franken  52), Schwäbisch Hall (1968).
 Hans Dieter Haller, "Friedrich David Gräter (1768 bis 1830)", in: Pegasus auf dem Land – Schriftsteller in Hohenlohe (2006), 154–159.

German philologists
Germanists
Germanic studies scholars
1768 births
1830 deaths
People from Schwäbisch Hall